Olivier Foulon (born 1976 Brussels) is a Belgian artist.

From 1991 to 1995, he studied at the Institut Saint-Luc, Brussels; from 1995 to 1999, he studied at the Ecole de Recherche Graphique, Brussels; from 2001 to 2002, he studied at the Jan van Eyck Academie.
In 2005–2006, he was artist in residence, Projekt-Just, Düsseldorf.

Awards
2009 Villa Romana prize
2005 Prix de la Jeune Peinture Belge – Crowet, Palais des Beaux-Arts, Brussels

Solo shows
2008 "Par delà le B. et le M. aussi", Musée Wellington, Waterloo (BE); "The Soliloquy of the Broom", Kölnischer Kunstverein, Cologne
2007 "Sprung in die Neuzeit – un seul ou plusieurs loups?", Galerie dépendance, Brussels; "redites et ratures" (Projekt für ein Schloss), Museum x, Museum Abteiberg, Mönchengladbach
2006 "redites et ratures" (alter Wein, neue Flaschen), Galerie Nadja Vilenne, Liège (BE); "redites et ratures", Projekt-Just, Düsseldorf
2004 "il Pleut, il Neige, il Peint", EAC (les halles), Porrentruy (CH); "Blind Man's Buff", Marres Center for Contemporary Art, Maastricht (NL); "Singe et Crocodile", Het Kabinet, Gent; "2. Un livre, un livre, des livres, des objets et des photos", Etablissement d'en face projects, Brussels
2003 "1. Des dessins de notes et caricatures", Etablissement d'en face projects, Brussels
2002 "En coulisses, parfois, les artistes changent de costumes" Actualités, Jan van Eyck Academie, Maastricht

References

External links
Comparative Viewing: Olivier Foulon

German artists
1976 births
Artists from Brussels
Living people
Belgian contemporary artists